The 3rd IPC Ice Sledge Hockey European Championships was held between February 12, 2011 and February 20, 2011 at Niphallen in Sollefteå, Sweden. Participating 130 athletes from ten nations: Czech Republic, Estonia, Germany, Great Britain, Italy, Netherlands, Norway, Poland, Russia and Sweden.

The 2011 European Championships is held as part of the 2011 Paralympic Winter World Cup (PWWC 2011), which also includes alpine skiing, biathlon and cross-country skiing.

In the Championships' second match, Norway's sledge hockey team set an international sledge hockey scoring record with 21–0. The Swedish team set a new scoring record in the classification semifinals, with 23–0.

There was one woman competing at the Championships, the Netherlands' goalkeeper Betty Meijer.

Team rosters

Group round

Group A

Group B

Classification round

Ninth place game

Classification semifinals

Seventh place game

Fifth place game

Medal round

Semifinals

Bronze medal game

Gold medal game

Final standings
The final standings of the tournament.

References

 EM i Sverige 2011 (Norwegian), Official site of Norway's sledge hockey team
 Norway's sledge hockey team Official site on Facebook
 Norway's sledge hockey team Official site on Twitter
Norge vant åpningskampen mot Estland 5–2 (Norwegian), The Official site of the Norwegian Ice Hockey Association, February 10, 2011
Results – 2011 IPC Ice Sledge Hockey European Championships Solleftea- SWEDEN (12–20 February 2011), IPC Ice Sledge Hockey

External links
PWWC 2011 – Ice Sledge Hockey
PWWC 2011 on Facebook
IPC Ice Sledge Hockey
2011 IPC ISH European Championships – Competition and Training Schedule
Results

Video
Paralympic Sport TV
12 full matches from the 2011 European Championships at TVcom.cz
Norway's sledge hockey team's Official YouTube site
Norway – Estonia (February 12)
Norway – Great Britain (February 14)
Norway – Netherlands (February 15)
Norway – Germany (February 17)
Norway – Italy (February 19)
Norway – Estonia (February 20)

Sled
Sled
2011
2011
Sport in Sollefteå
February 2011 sports events in Europe